Zuu (stylized in all caps) is the fourth studio album by American rapper Denzel Curry, released through PH Recordings and distributed by Loma Vista Recordings on May 31, 2019. The title is a nickname for his home city, Carol City, Miami, Florida.

Zuu is the follow-up to Curry's 2018 studio album Ta13oo. It was supported by two singles: "Ricky" and "Speedboat". The album received widespread acclaim from critics, with many praising Curry's tributes to other artists from Carol City.

Themes
Denzel Curry said that while his previous album Ta13oo (2018) was rooted in darker themes, Zuu came from homesickness for Miami. He explained: "it goes from the sounds of where I grew up, to what I was raised around, to the people I was raised around, to the sounds that pretty much shaped the person I am."

Promotion
The first single, "Ricky", was released on May 8, 2019, for streaming and digital download, along with an accompanying music video. The second single, "Speedboat", was released on May 21, for streaming and digital download after Curry teased it on social media. Curry's television debut on The Tonight Show Starring Jimmy Fallon, included a medley of "Ricky" and "Wish".

Critical reception

Zuu was met with widespread critical acclaim. At Metacritic, which assigns a normalized rating out of 100 to reviews from mainstream publications, the album received an average score of 85, based on eight reviews. Aggregator AnyDecentMusic? gave it 7.6 out of 10, based on their assessment of the critical consensus.

Neil Z. Yeung of AllMusic saying "In less than a half hour, Curry establishes himself not only as one of the most capable and exciting artists of his generation, but also worthy of a place in Miami's rap pedigree, right alongside the local icons who inspired this gem". Danny Schwartz of Highsnobiety said, "If TA1300 was a deep inward dive, ZUU is a mighty outward gesture, a salute to the masses". In a positive review, Joey Chini of Exclaim! said of the album that, "Lyrically – despite sometimes perpetuating hip-hop clichés – Curry maintains his truthfulness and willingness to address the problems of the culture, all while playing with clever bars and meaningful sentiments". Writing for Pitchfork, Sheldon Pearce ranked the album as "Best New Music" and praised the album as a tribute to Curry's hometown Carol City, calling it a "stunning Miami rap opus". Christopher Theissen of Consequence praised the album's energy in a positive review, calling it a "well-crafted action film", but criticized the short track list, saying, "But in the context of a half-hour record, every lackluster step is amplified". HipHopDXs critic Justin Ivey said, "ZUU is filled with entertaining records, but their relatively short runtimes often leave one yearning for more. This brevity is just minor quibble though when presented with rewind-worthy efforts such as "Ricky", a creation named after Curry's father".

Kyann-Sian Williams of NME wrote, "The 24-year-old Floridian rapper combines dreamy, ethereal beats with hard-hitting sounds and rhymes to relay his unique – and compelling – life story". Will Rosebury of Clash gave a positive review, stating "ZUU is an experience that transports the listener to a specific time and place. ZUU is further proof that Denzel Curry is one of hip-hop's most interesting and progressive MCs". Steve "Flash" Juon from RapReviews stated, "Even though I said Curry raps more than his peers, I didn't say he NEVER sings. He flips back and forth between both on tracks like the Rugah Rajh produced "Speedboat", but the nice thing is that he's not so heavily medicated and AutoTuned that you can't follow along with his delivery".

Year-end lists

Track listing
Credits were adapted from the album's liner notes.

Notes
  signifies a co-producer
 "Speedboat" features additional vocals by J. Nick

Sample credits
 "Ricky" contains a sample of "Twisted Blood" as performed by Lukid, written by Luke Blair.
 "Wish" contains an interpolation of "Genie", written by Ulysses Kae Williams.
 "Speedboat" contains a sample of "Don Juan", written and performed by Michel Magne.
 "Carolmart" contains a sample of "So Fresh" as performed by Trina, written by Derrick Baker, Richard Jones, James Scheffer, Mark Seymour, Katrina Taylor, and Algernod Washington.
 "Shake 88" contains a sample of "Boot the Booty" as performed by MC Cool Rock & MC Chaszy Chess, written by Clay Dixon, Bobby Ford, and Cedric Woodside.
 "P.A.T." contains a sample of "Possessed" as performed by SpaceGhostPurrp, written by Markese Rolle.

Charts

References 

2019 albums
Denzel Curry albums
Albums produced by Ronny J
Albums produced by Tay Keith
Hip hop albums by American artists